Stenocosmia is a genus of beetles in the family Cicindelidae, containing the following species:

 Stenocosmia angusta Rivalier, 1965
 Stenocosmia tenuicollis (Fairmaire, 1904)

References

Cicindelidae